Lepo may refer to:

People
 Lepo Sumera (1950–2000), Estonian composer and teacher

Places

Other
 Low Exercise Price Option